Aale Johannes Sariola (19 May 1882 - 5 October 1948; original surname Hagberg) was a Finnish Lutheran clergyman and politician, born in Oulu. He was a member of the Parliament of Finland from 1916 to 1917, representing the Finnish Party.

References

1882 births
1948 deaths
People from Oulu
People from Oulu Province (Grand Duchy of Finland)
20th-century Finnish Lutheran clergy
Finnish Party politicians
Members of the Parliament of Finland (1916–17)
University of Helsinki alumni